The French submarine Dauphin was a Reqin (French for shark)-class submarine built for the French Navy in the mid-1920s. Laid down in December 1922, it was launched in April 1925 and commissioned in November 1927. It was captured by Italian forces on 8 December 1942 and renamed FR 115. It was later recaptured by the Germans on 9 September 1943, then scuttled on 15 September 1943. The name Dauphin comes from the French word for Dolphin.

Design
Propulsion while surfaced was provided by two  diesel motors and two  electric motors.

Career 
Dauphin served in the Mediterranean and, after the Armistice of 22 June 1940, was under the control of the Vichy government. In December 1942, she was taken over by the Germans in Bizerte and transferred to Italy. In the Regia Marina, Dauphin received the designation FR 115. After Italy had concluded a ceasefire with the Allies, the ship was taken over by the Germans in Pozzuoli in September 1943 and then scuttled.

Citations

References 

World War II submarines of France
Requin-class submarines